The 1905 Indiana Hoosiers football team was an American football team that represented Indiana University Bloomington during the 1905 Western Conference football season. In their first season under head coach James M. Sheldon, the Hoosiers compiled an 8–1–1 record and outscored their opponents by a combined total of 240 to 38.

Schedule

References

Indiana
Indiana Hoosiers football seasons
Indiana Hoosiers football